Graciela may refer to

 Graciela (Grillo-Pérez) (1915–2010), Cuban singer
 Graciela Aranis (1908–1996), Chilean painter, cartoonist
 Graciela Araya (born 1962), Chilean-Austrian mezzo-soprano
 Graciela Beltrán (born 1974), Mexican singer and actress
 Graciela Borges (born 1941), Argentine actress
 Graciela Rodo Boulanger (born 1935), Bolivian painter
 Graciella Carvalho (born 1985), Brazilian beauty contest contestant and model
 Graciela Casillas-Boggs (born 1957), American boxer and kickboxer
 Graciela Chichilnisky (born 1944), Argentine-American mathematical economist 
 Graciela Daniele (born 1939), Argentine-American dancer
 Graciela Dixon, Panamanian jurist
 Graciela Fernández Meijide (born 1931), Argentine politician and human rights activist
 Graciela Iturbide (born 1942), Mexican photographer
 Graciela Limón (born 1938), Mexican novelist
 Graciela Márquez (born 1978), Venezuelan volleyball player
 Graciela Mendoza (María Graciela Mendoza Barrios) (born 1963), Mexican racewalker
 Graciela Metternicht, Belgian-Australian geomorphologist
 Graciela Naranjo (1916–2001), Venezuelan singer and actress
 Graciela Palau de Nemes (1919–2019), Spanish-American literary critic
 Graciela Ocaña (born 1960), Argentine politician
 Graciela Olivarez (1928–1987), American lawyer and civil rights activist
 Graciela Rivera (1921–2011), Puerto Rican soprano
 Graciela Sapriza (born 1945), Uruguayan historian, educator
 Graziella Schazad (born 1983), German singer and songwriter
 Graciela Stefani (born 1960), Argentine actress
 Graciela Yataco (born c. 1987), Peruvian model

See also
 Graciella (disambiguation)
 Grace (given name)

Feminine given names